The enzyme lactate aldolase catalyzes the chemical reaction

(S)-lactate  formate + acetaldehyde

This enzyme belongs to the family of lyases, specifically the aldehyde-lyases, which cleave carbon-carbon bonds.  The systematic name of this enzyme class is (S)-lactate acetaldehyde-lyase (formate-forming). Other names in common use include lactate synthase, and (S)-lactate acetaldehyde-lyase.  This enzyme participates in pyruvate metabolism.

References

 

EC 4.1.2
Enzymes of unknown structure